Beckfoot railway station is a railway station on the 15" gauge Ravenglass & Eskdale Railway in Cumbria. It is situated within a  walk of the eastern terminus of the line, at Dalegarth station.

The station opened to passengers in 1876.  In the days of the 3 ft gauge railway, this was the last place where the railway met the main valley road, and as such had a greater number of facilities than other stations, including a goods yard and shed, and a chocolate vending machine in the waiting shelter.

Between 1918 and 1922, Beckfoot was the upper terminus of the railway prior to the extension of the line to the present terminus at Dalegarth.  The original station building survived for some time into the 15 inch gauge era, but had been demolished by the time the preservationists took over in 1960.

It can be accessed either by steps or from, the road which crosses the line, east of the station. It differs from the other stations in that passengers will only be picked up here on down journeys (Dalegarth-Ravenglass) and will only be set down here on up journeys (Ravenglass-Dalegarth). This is because the station is close to Dalegarth, and to save stopping for passengers completing very short journeys. There is a level crossing at the eastern end of the platform, marking the beginning of the private road from Beckfoot to Dalegarth cottages which runs for half a mile eastwards. This road is known as Beckfoot Lonnin and walkers can continue behind the Cottages at the end of the Lonnin up to the original 3' gauge railway station at Boot village.

Accessibility
Due to the length of the platform, the railway are unable to accommodate wheelchair passengers, for health & safety reasons.

Gallery

References

Heritage railway stations in Cumbria
Ravenglass and Eskdale Railway